Lohi is a town and union council of Dureji Tehsil in Balochistan province, Pakistan. It is located at 28°56'0N 68°4'0E with an altitude of 93 metres (308 feet).

See also
Abra

References

Union councils of Lasbela District
Populated places in Lasbela District